This is a list of wars involving Bosnia and Herzegovina.

Medieval Bosnia

Ottoman Bosnia

Austro-Hungarian Bosnia and Herzegovina

Yugoslav Bosnia and Herzegovina

Republic of Bosnia and Herzegovina

See also
 List of wars involving Yugoslavia

 
Bosnia and Herzegovina
 
Wars